The 2000 McNeese State Cowboys football team was an American football team that represented McNeese State University as a member of the Southland Conference (Southland) during the 2000 NCAA Division I-AA football season. In their first year under head coach Tommy Tate, the team compiled an overall record of 8–4, with a mark of 5–2 in conference play, and finished tied for second in the Southland. The Cowboys advanced to the NCAA Division I-AA Football Championship playoffs and lost to Georgia Southern in the first round.

Schedule

References

McNeese State
McNeese Cowboys football seasons
McNeese State Cowboys football